Chematica now known as Synthia is a retrosynthesis software that uses algorithms and a collective database to predict synthesis pathways for molecules. The software development, led by Bartosz A. Grzybowski, was finally publicized in August, 2012. Hand-coded by chemists and engineered by computer scientists, this synthetic planning tool draws from a profound chemical abstracts database of advanced organic synthesis rules and algorithms. Computer-aided synthesis allows you to rapidly generate synthetic routes to identified targets.

In 2017, the software and database were wholly purchased by Merck KGaA | MRK. The software has been made available commercially since the acquisition as Synthia. Based on years of development as Chematica, then further enhancement as SYNTHIA™, this software now enables chemists to easily navigate through viable pathways that can be executed at the bench.

Features
The software was designed to combine long synthesis paths into shorter and more economical paths.
The software complements other attempts such as manual searching or semi-automated search tools.

A molecule can be specified in multiple ways, including searching by Beilstein Registry Number, CAS registry number, chemical name, SMILES structure, or by drawing the molecule diagram itself. It supports optimization of reactions by cost. The program also supports 3D modeling of individual molecules, as well as labeling of functional groups.

The program also notes regulated and unregulated compounds, and uses specialized algorithms that avoid these. It also gives the classification and reasons for regulation.

With this bench-validated retrosynthetic planning software, successfully design and plan routes for target molecules based on your requirements.

 Select the type of retrosynthesis analysis to be performed and the target molecule from known and unknown compounds.
 Customize search parameters: set a price threshold, protecting group preferences, scoring functions, stop conditions, and many more options.
 Directly link to commercially available and known starting materials with price information and/or incorporate your custom inventory (patent pending).
 Easily filter, sort, compare, and analyze custom pathways by viewing detailed molecule structures or graphs to explore the most cost-effective routes to chemical targets.

Latest Nature publication can provide insights on AI driven innovation in drug discovery.

References

Chemical databases